Christel DeHaan ( Stark, October 20, 1942 – June 6, 2020) was a German-American businesswoman and philanthropist who was the owner of Resort Condominiums International and the founder of Christel House International.

Early life
DeHaan was born in 1942 in Nördlingen, Germany, the daughter of Adolf Stark, a German soldier who died shortly before the end of World War II, and his wife Anna Stark. Her stepfather, Wilhelm Riedel died when she was 16. At the age of 16, she moved to the United Kingdom to become a nanny. Aged 20, she emigrated to the United States, settling in Indiana.

Career
In 1974, DeHaan co-founded the pioneering timeshare company Resort Condominiums International, with her then-husband Jon DeHaan. In 1979, he had a heart attack, and she took over the running of the company. In 1987, they divorced; she was awarded half the company and bought the rest for $67.5 million.

In 1995, she sold RCI for $825 million.

Philanthropy
DeHaan founded and donated $220 million to the Christel House International.

Personal life
In 1972, she married Jon DeHaan (b. 1940). She had three children and lived in Indianapolis, Indiana, US. She died on June 6, 2020, at her home.

References

1942 births
2020 deaths
20th-century American businesspeople
20th-century American businesswomen
20th-century German businesspeople
21st-century American businesspeople
21st-century American businesswomen
21st-century German businesspeople
American billionaires
American women philanthropists
Businesspeople from Indianapolis
Female billionaires
German billionaires
German emigrants to the United States
German philanthropists
German women philanthropists
People from Nördlingen